Mousse is a form of creamy dessert typically made from egg and cream.

Mousse may also refer to:
 Hair mousse
 Mousse, a character from the Ranma ½ series.
 Tire mousse, a flexible foam ring that replaces or complements the inner tube of a tire.
 Moussé, a commune in the French department of Ille-et-Vilaine
 Mousse T., a German DJ and record producer of Turkish origin

Not to be confused with:
 Moose, a species of animal alternatively known as the elk